Nathaniel Alden Sherman (February 7, 1888 – August 4, 1954) was an American athlete.  He competed at the 1908 Summer Olympics in London. He was born in Boston, Massachusetts.

In the 100 meters, Sherman won his first round heat with a time of 11.2 seconds to advance to the semifinals.  He lost his semifinal, taking second place with a time of 11.3 seconds to Robert Kerr's 11.0 seconds; this eliminated Sherman from the final.

Sherman won his preliminary heat of the 200 meters as well, with a time of 22.8 seconds.  He again took second in the semifinals, losing to countryman Nate Cartmell with a time of 22.9 seconds to Cartmell's 22.6 seconds.

He attended Dartmouth College.

References

Sources
 
 
 

1888 births
1954 deaths
Dartmouth College alumni
Athletes (track and field) at the 1908 Summer Olympics
Olympic track and field athletes of the United States
American male sprinters